Nakhon Thai is a district (amphoe) in the eastern part of Phitsanulok province, central Thailand.

Geography
Neighboring districts are (from the southwest clockwise), Wang Thong and Chat Trakan of Phitsanulok Province; Na Haeo and Dan Sai of Loei province; and Khao Kho of Phetchabun province.

Phu Hin Rong Kla National Park is in Nakhon Thai District.

Nakhon Thai lies within the Nan Basin, which is part of the Chao Phraya Watershed. The Khwae Noi River flows through the district, as well as the lesser Fia (Thai: ลำน้ำเฟี้ย) and Kaem (Thai: ลำน้ำแขม) Rivers.

Administration

Provincial administration 
Nakhon Thai is divided into 11 sub-districts (tambons), which are further subdivided into 145 administrative villages (mubans).

Local administration 
There are two sub-district municipalities (thesaban tambons) in the district:
 Nakhon Thai consisting of sub-district Nakhon Thai.
 Ban Yaeng consisting of sub-district Ban Yaeng.

There are nine sub-district administrative organizations (SAO) in the district:
 Nong Kathao consisting of sub-district Nong Kathao.
 Noen Phoem consisting of sub-district Noen Phoem.
 Na Bua consisting of sub-district Na Bua.
 Bo Pho consisting of sub-district Bo Pho.
 Huai Hia consisting of sub-district Huai Hia.
 Ban Phrao consisting of sub-district Ban Phrao.
 Yang Klon consisting of sub-district Yang Klon.
 Nakhon Chum consisting of sub-district Nakhon Chum.
 Nam Kum consisting of sub-district Nam Kum.

Temples
There are 23 Buddhist temples in Nakhon Thai.

References

Nakhon Thai